Eva Riera (born 16 May 1971) is a former synchronized swimmer from Brazil.

References 

1971 births
Living people
Brazilian synchronized swimmers
Olympic synchronized swimmers of Brazil
Synchronized swimmers at the 1988 Summer Olympics
20th-century Brazilian women